The 7th Annual Interactive Achievement Awards is the 7th edition of the Interactive Achievement Awards, an annual awards event that honors the best games in the video game industry. It was also held as part of the academy's 2004 D.I.C.E. Summit. It was hosted by Diane Mizota.

Call of Duty won Game of the Year. Prince of Persia: The Sands of Time received the most nominations and won the most awards. Electronic Arts received the most nominations and was tied with Ubisoft for winning the most awards. There was also a tie for two categories: Outstanding Achievement in Character Performance - Female and Console Family Game of the Year.

Peter Molyneux was also the recipient of the Academy of Interactive Arts & Sciences Hall of Fame Award.

Winners and Nominees
Winners are listed first, highlighted in boldface, and indicated with a double dagger.

Hall of Fame Award
 Peter Molyneux

Games with multiple nominations and awards

The following 25 games received multiple nominations:

The following seven games received multiple awards:

Companies with multiple nominations

Companies that received multiple nominations as either a developer or a publisher.

Companies that received multiple awards as either a developer or a publisher.

External links
 Archived Winners List

References

2004 awards
2004 awards in the United States
March 2004 events in the United States
2003 in video gaming
D.I.C.E. Award ceremonies